"Konnichiwa" is the seventh single by The Superions, a side project of Fred Schneider of The B-52s.  The single was released to iTunes Stores as a digital download on May 12, 2014 and is the first single to be released from a collection titled The Vertical Mind.

"If you're itching for some retro B-52s flavor, "Konnichiwa" features Schneider's unmistakable "Love Shack"-style verbalizing." - Andy Towle, Towleroad

"It's just not summer without a little Fred Schneider." - Whitney Matheson, USA Today's Pop Candy

Track listing
 "Konnichiwa" 4:33

Personnel 
Band
 Fred Schneider - lyrics and vocals
 Noah Brodie - keyboards, electronic drums and guitar
 Dan Marshall - programming and keyboards

Production
 Producer: The Superions and Ursula 1000
 Mastering: Bob Katz at Digital Domain

External links
 Konnichiwa - Single on iTunes

References

The Superions songs
2014 songs
Songs written by Fred Schneider